Thierry Peugeot (born 1957) is a French heir and business executive.

Early life
Thierry Peugeot was born in 1957. His father, Pierre Peugeot, served as the Chairman of Peugeot. He has a sister, Marie-Hélène Roncoroni. He graduated from the ESSEC Business School.

Career
He has served on the Board of Directors of Société Foncière Financières et de Participations, the family investment company, since 1991. He has served as a Director of Faurecia since 2003 and Air Liquide since 2005.

He served the Chairman of the Supervisory Board of PSA Peugeot Citroën from 2002 to 2014. He stepped down after he disagreed with the other major shareholders, the French state and the Chinese company Dongfeng Motor, about the need to share the same strategic future as Dongfeng Motor.

He serves as one of five honorary presidents of the Association Nationale des Sociétés par Actions.

References

1957 births
Living people
Businesspeople from Paris
Lycée Janson-de-Sailly alumni
ESSEC Business School alumni
INSEAD alumni
French business executives
French corporate directors
PSA Group people
Air Liquide people
Chevaliers of the Légion d'honneur